Jessie Woodrow Wilson Sayre (August 28, 1887 – January 15, 1933) was a daughter of US President Woodrow Wilson and Ellen Louise Axson.  She was a political activist, worked for women's suffrage, social issues, to promote her father's call for the creation of the League of Nations, and was significant in the Massachusetts Democratic Party during the 1920s.

Biography

Jessie Woodrow Wilson was born in Gainesville, Georgia, the second daughter of Woodrow and Ellen Axson Wilson. She was the middle sister of Margaret Woodrow Wilson and Eleanor Wilson McAdoo.
Wilson was educated privately in Princeton, New Jersey and at Goucher College in Baltimore, Maryland.  She was a member of Gamma Phi Beta sorority. After her graduation from Goucher, she worked at a settlement home in Philadelphia for three years.

White House years

In July 1913, four months after her father assumed the presidency, the Wilsons announced Jessie's engagement to Francis Bowes Sayre, Sr.  Her fiancé, a 1911 graduate of Harvard Law School, was the son of Robert Sayre, builder of the Lehigh Valley Railroad and organizer and general manager of the Bethlehem Iron Works.  At the time of their engagement he was serving in the office of a district attorney. Their November 25, 1913, wedding was the thirteenth White House wedding, and the first since Alice Roosevelt and Nicholas Longworth were wed in 1906.

Upon their return from their honeymoon in Europe, they moved to Williamstown, Massachusetts, where her husband began his service as an assistant to the president of Williams College.

On January 17, 1915, she gave birth in the White House to a son, Francis B. Sayre, Jr. (January 17, 1915 – October 3, 2008), who became a noted clergyman and was a social activist like his mother.  The following year, a daughter, Eleanor Axson Sayre (March 26, 1916 – May 12, 2001), was born. In 1919 they were joined by Woodrow Wilson Sayre (February 22, 1919 – September 16, 2002).

Massachusetts and Siam
After World War I, the Sayres moved to Cambridge, Massachusetts, where Francis accepted a position on the Harvard Law School faculty.  There, she worked in the interests of the Democratic Party, the League of Nations, and the League of Women Voters. She was also involved with the YWCA, serving on its national board. At the time of Woodrow Wilson's death in 1924, the couple were living in Siam (now Thailand) where Francis was working as an advisor on international law at the Royal Court of Siam.

In 1928, she made the introductory speech for presidential nominee Al Smith at the Democratic National Convention. In 1929 her name was mentioned as a candidate for the Democratic nomination for United States Senator, for the seat then held by Republican Frederick H. Gillett. However, she declined.  She became secretary of the Massachusetts Democratic State Committee instead.

Death
Sayre died at age 45 after undergoing abdominal surgery at Cambridge Hospital in Cambridge, Massachusetts.  Some reports state that she suffered from a gall bladder disorder, while others state that she had undergone an emergency appendectomy.  Two years later, the Boston branch of the Women's Democratic League was renamed the Jessie Woodrow Sayre Women's Democratic League.

She is buried in Nisky Hill Cemetery in Bethlehem, Pennsylvania.

References

External links

Jessie Wilson Sayre Papers at the Seeley G. Mudd Manuscript Library, Princeton University
Woodrow Wilson's Letters: to his "darling Daughter" Shapell Manuscript Foundation

1887 births
1933 deaths
19th-century American women
20th-century American women
Children of presidents of the United States
Goucher College alumni
Harvard Law School faculty
Massachusetts Democrats
People from Cambridge, Massachusetts
People from Gainesville, Georgia
Woodrow Wilson family
American suffragists
American women legal scholars
20th-century American people
American women academics